I've Had It may refer to:

Books
I've Had It, wartime memoir by Beirne Lay, Jr. 1945

Music
I've Had It: The Very Best of the Bell Notes, compilation album The Bell Notes 1998

Songs
"I've Had It" (The Bell Notes song), 1958
"I've Had It", song by Aimee Mann, Mann, from Whatever (Aimee Mann album) 1993
"I've Had It", song by Black Flag, G. Ginn from	Nervous Breakdown (EP) 1978
"I've Had It", song by George Smith (musician) 	B. Benjamin, S. Marcus 1965
"I've Had It", song by Lee Andrews And The Hearts Andrews, Jackson, Bell 1968
"I've Had It", song by The Shirts	Ronald Ardito 1980
"I've Had It", song by Danielle Brisebois from Portable Life 1999